V4650 Sagittarii (qF362) is a luminous blue variable star (LBV) in the constellation of Sagittarius. Located some 25,000 light years away, the star is positioned on the edge of a starburst cluster known as the Quintuplet cluster.

Discovery

V4650 Sgr was first catalogued in 1996 as star 362 in a list of stars in the galactic centre region near the Quintuplet Cluster.  The acronym qF is used for stars in the list and so the star name is qF 362.  The acronym FMM is also used, hence FMM 362.  The LBV nature of qF 362 was not recognised until 1999.  It is one of three LBVs close to the Quintuplet Cluster, all highly luminous stars.

V4650 was discovered using infrared telescopes.  It is extremely faint at optical wavelengths due to interstellar extinction.  The 2MASS survey recorded it at 17th magnitude in red light and 19th magnitude in blue light, while it is a 7th magnitude object in K band infrared.

Properties

It is considered to be a bona-fide luminous blue variable, although it has not been observed to change temperature from the S Doradus minimum strip to a cooler outburst state. The infrared brightness has varied between magnitude 7.0 and 7.9. Unlike both the two nearby LBVs, V4650 Sgr has no detectable associated nebulosity.

References

Luminous blue variables
Sagittarius (constellation)
Sagittarii, V4647
J17461798-2849034